The Port of Bar (Montenegrin: Luka Bar, Лука Бар, MNSE: LUBA) is Montenegro's main sea port. It is located in Bar.

History
The Port of Bar was used as a sea port for Shkodër before it was conquered by the Turks in 1571. Right after the conquest of Bar, the Turks constructed a small port with one breakwater and wooden pier. This former Turkish port has been maintained and expanded since 1878, when Montenegro gained Bar after becoming officially independent from Ottoman Turkey. Montenegro became the first South Slavic state to have a port to the sea.

Construction of the port formally started on March 23, 1905, when King Nikola I, on board on the yacht Rumija, plunged a foundation stone, on which his initials and the date were carved in, into the sea. The Port of Bar officially began construction on June 27, 1906, even though the port was founded the same day. Coen Caglia, an Italian expert in maritime construction designed the port for an annual turnover of 3 million tons of cargo. Despite all the planning, only the 250 meter breakwater was constructed and put into operation on October 23, 1909.

During World War II, Germans mined and destroyed the port almost completely in 1944 while retreating. Reconstruction started in 1950, and the construction for a large port started four years later. The first phase was completed in 1965. The second phase that had in its plan an annual turnover of cca 5 million tons of cargo was almost completed, when the catastrophic earthquake struck in 1979, destroying more than half of its modern port facilities.

The reconstruction and renewal of the port's facilities started in 1981 and today's port of Bar, capable of handling cca 5 million tons of cargo, officially began operations on July 13, 1983.

Operations 
Currently, the Port of Bar is operating with a financial loss, and significantly below its designed capacity. With Montenegrin market being too small to fully utilize its capacity and make it a profitable port, it is generally accepted that Port of Bar has to acquire new markets to which it would cater. The announced building of Belgrade–Bar motorway and proposed reconstruction of Belgrade–Bar railway would thus mark a breakthrough in attracting the Serbia's, and thus the Central European market.

Terminals
RO - RO Terminal
Timber Terminal
Container Terminal
General Cargo Terminal
Bulk Terminal
Grain Terminal
Liquid Cargo Terminal
Passenger Terminal

Ferry lines
Bar-Bari, Bari-Bar

References

External links
(Montenegrin)  Official Website
(Montenegrin)  Listing on the Montenegro Stock Exchange

Bar
1906 establishments in Montenegro
Transport companies established in 1906